is a district located in Tochigi Prefecture, Japan.

As of 2005, the district has an estimated population of 76,471 and a density of 480.35 persons per km2. The total area is 159.20 km2.

The district has one town.
Kaminokawa

Timeline (1960s to present)
April 1, 1966 - The village of Kawachi gained town status.
April 1, 1971 - The village of Minamikawachi gained town status.
July 1, 1994 - The village of Kamikawachi gained town status.
January 10, 2006 - The town of Minamikawachi merged with the towns of Ishibashi and Kokubunji, both from Shimotsuga District to form the city of Shimotsuke.
March 31, 2007 - The towns of Kamikawachi and Kawachi merged into the city of Utsunomiya.

Districts in Tochigi Prefecture